Karl Miller (2 October 1913 – 18 April 1967) was a German footballer who played as a defender for FC St. Pauli, Dresdner SC, LSV Hamburg and the Germany national team.

Early life
Miller was born in the Neustadt region of Hamburg as the son of a butcher.

Club career
Miller started his career at FC St. Pauli, making his debut for the club in the 1932–33 season. He was also selected to represent a North German representative team in 1935. During World War II, he was stationed at a Luftwaffe unit in Saxony whilst playing as a guest player for Dresdner SC. With Dresdner SC he won the Tschammerpokal in 1940 and 1941. He returned to Hamburg and played for FC St. Pauli and LSV Hamburg before returning to St. Pauli again in 1944. He retired following the 1949–50 season, aged 37.

International career
Miller played 12 times for the Germany national football team between 1941 and 1942.

References

External links
 
 
 
 

1913 births
1967 deaths
People from Hamburg-Mitte
German footballers
Association football defenders
Germany international footballers
Footballers from Hamburg
FC St. Pauli players
Dresdner SC players
Luftwaffen-SV Hamburg players
Luftwaffe personnel of World War II